Najwyższy Czas! (Pol. About Time!) is a Polish libertarian conservative sociopolitical weekly news magazine, published since 31 March 1990 by Oficyna Konserwatystów i Liberałów, owned by Janusz Korwin-Mikke and connected with the Confederation Liberty and Independence.

References

External links
 Home page of Najwyższy Czas!

1990 establishments in Poland
Conservatism in Poland
Conservative magazines
Far-right politics in Poland
Magazines established in 1990
Magazines published in Warsaw
News magazines published in Poland
Polish-language magazines
Weekly magazines published in Poland